The Syntagma Metro Station Archeological Collection is a museum in Athens, Greece.  It is located at the Syntagma station of the Athens metro and it features a variety of historical items unearthed during the process of building the metro.

External links
City of Athens, Metro
Ministry of Culture and Tourism (Greek only)

Athens Metro
Archaeological museums in Athens
Archaeological collections in Greece